Patapsco station is a Baltimore Light Rail station in Halethorpe, Maryland. The stop is located along Patapsco Avenue from which its name is derived. The station serves as a hub for several MTA bus routes. Patapsco was the final stop along the line for a period from September 1992 until April 1993, when the line was extended to Linthicum.

The station has 216 spaces for commuters, some of that allow for overnight parking. Patapasco station was the original northern terminus of the Baltimore and Annapolis Railroad, which connected to the Curtis Bay Branch of the Baltimore and Ohio Railroad.

Bus routes 14, 17, 51, and 77 lay over at the station. Route 16 also passes through the station in both directions along its route.

Station layout

References

External links
Schedules
Station portal (local train and bus times)

Baltimore Light Rail stations
Cherry Hill, Baltimore
Railway stations in the United States opened in 1992
1992 establishments in Maryland
Railway stations in Baltimore County, Maryland